Marjanus is a genus of ground spiders containing the single species, Marjanus platnicki. It was  first described by M. Chatzaki in 2018, and is only found in Greece and China.

References

External links

Gnaphosidae
Monotypic Araneomorphae genera